Typographic features made possible using digital typographic systems have solved many the demands placed on computer systems to replicate traditional typography and have expanded the possibilities with many new features. Three systems are in common use: OpenType, devised by Microsoft and Adobe, Apple's Apple Advanced Typography (AAT), and SIL's Graphite. The lists below provide information about OpenType and AAT features. Graphite does not have a fixed set of features; instead it provides a way for fonts to define their own features.

OpenType typographic features
The OpenType format defines a number of typographic features that a particular font may support. Some software, such as Adobe InDesign or recent versions of Lua/XeTeX, gives users control of these features, for example to enable fancy stylistic capital letters (swash caps) or to choose between ranging (full-height) and non-ranging (old-style, or lower-case) digits. Some web browsers also support OpenType features in accordance with the CSS Fonts Module Level 3 specification, which allows OpenType features to be set directly via the  property, or indirectly by means of higher-level mechanisms.

The following tables list the features defined in version 1.8.1 of the OpenType specification. The codes in the "type" column are explained after the tables.
OpenType features may be applicable only to certain language scripts or specific languages, or in certain writing modes. The features are split into several tables accordingly.

Features primarily intended for or exclusively required by South-Asian alphasyllabaries (Indic/Brahmic)

Features primarily intended for or exclusively required by East-Asian tetragrams (Chinese, Japanese, Korean)

Features primarily intended for or exclusively required by West-Asian (Semitic, Arabic) and other cursive scripts or fonts

Features intended for bicameral [cased] alphabets (Latin, Greek, Cyrillic, etc.)

Features depending on writing direction

Features intended for digits and math

Ligation and alternate forms features intended for all scripts

Positioning features intended for all scripts

Special features intended for all scripts

Legend of substitution and positioning codes 
Below are listed the OpenType lookup table types, as used in the "type" column in the above tables. S stands for substitution, and P stands for positioning. Note that often a feature can be implemented by more than one type of table, and that sometimes the specification fails to explicitly indicate the table type.

AAT typographic features
Features that take one value, mutual exclusive from the rest:

 Annotation nalt
 No Annotation
 Box Annotation
 Rounded Box Annotation
 Circle Annotation
 Inverted Circle Annotation
 Parenthesis Annotation
 Period Annotation
 Roman Numeral Annotation
 Diamond Annotation
 Character Alternatives
 No Alternates
 … rand; aalt, calt, falt, jalt, salt, ssXX, hkna/vkna, rtla, vrt2
 Character Shape half, ruby; ljmo, vjmo, tjmo
 Traditional Characters trad
 Simplified Characters smpl
 JIS 1978 Characters jp78
 JIS 1983 Characters jp83
 JIS 1990 Characters jp90
 Traditional Characters, Alternative Set 1…5 tnam, hojo, nlck
 Expert Characters expt, locl
 CJK Latin Spacing 
 Half-width hwid, halt
 Proportional pwid, palt
 Default Latin
 Full-width Latin fwid
 Cursive Connection init, medi/med2, fina/fin2/fin3; haln, nukt, vatu, rphf, pres, pstf/psts
 Unconnected isol
 Partially Connected calt, clig
 Cursive curs
 Design Complexity
 Design Level 1
 Design Level …
 Diacritics
 Show Diacritics
 Hide Diacritics
 Decompose Diacritics ccmp
 Fractions
 No Fractions
 Vertical Fractions afrc
 Diagonal Fractions frac, dnom, numr
 Ideographic Spacing
 Full Width fwid
 Proportional pwid, palt
 Kana Spacing
 Full Width fwid
 Proportional pwid, palt
 Letter Case case
 Upper & Lower Case
 All Caps 
 All Lower Case
 Small Caps smcp, pcap
 Initial Caps  c2sc, c2pc
 Initial Caps and Small Caps
 Number Case
 Lower Case Numbers onum
 Upper Case Numbers lnum
 Number Spacing
 Monospaced Numbers tnum
 Proportional Numbers pnum
 Ornament Sets ornm
 None
 Dingbats
 Pi Characters
 Fleurons
 Decorative Borders
 International Symbols
 Math Symbols mgrk
 Text Spacing
 Proportional pwid, palt
 Monospace fwid
 Half-width hwid, halt
 Normal
 Vertical Position
 No Vertical Position
 Superiors supr
 Inferiors subs, sinf
 Ordinals ordn
Features that take a number of values:
 Ligatures
 Required Ligatures rlig, clig
 Common Ligatures liga
 Rare Ligatures hlig, dlig
 Logos
 Rebus Pictures
 Diphthong Ligatures
 Squared Ligatures
 Squared Ligatures, Abbreviated
 Mathematical Extras
 Hyphen to Minus (‘-’ → ‘−’)
 Asterisk to Multiply (‘*’ → ‘×’)
 Slash to Divide (‘/’ → ‘÷’)
 Inequality Ligatures
 Exponents
 Smart Swashes swsh, cswh
 Word Initial Swashes
 Word Final Swashes
 Line Initial Swashes
 Line Final Swashes falt
 Non-Final Swashes jalt
 Style Options
 No Style Options
 Display Text size
 Engraved Text
 Illuminated Caps
 Titling Caps titl
 Tall Caps
 Transliteration locl
 No Transliteration
 Hanja to Hangul
 Hanja to Hangul, Alternative Set 1…3
 Hiragana to Katakana
 Katakana to Hiragana
 Kana to Romanization
 Romanization to Hiragana
 Romanization to Katakana
 Typographic Extras
 Hyphens to Em Dash (‘--’ → ‘—’)
 Hyphen to En Dash (‘-’ → ‘–’)
 Unslashed Zero zero
 Form Interrobang (‘!?’/‘?!’ → ‘‽’)
 Smart Quotes (‘"'"’ → ‘“’”’)
 Periods to Ellipsis (‘...’ → ‘…’)

Binary features that can only be turned on:

 All Typographic Features
 Linguistic Rearrangement
 Overlapping Characters
 Vertical Substitution

External links
 
  – AAT layout tag specs
 
 

Typography
Typesetting